Kenneth Leeuwin (born 19 October 1961) is a retired Dutch-Surinamese karateka. He was a European champion in middleweight categories in 1984 and 1979 and won a gold medal at the 1986 World Championships.

Personal life

Dutch politician Sylvana Simons is Kenneth Leeuwin's half sister.

References

1961 births
Living people
Dutch male karateka
Surinamese male karateka
Surinamese emigrants to the Netherlands
Sportspeople from Paramaribo